Sanabor is a village in the hills northeast of Vipava in the Littoral region of Slovenia.

Church

The local church is dedicated to the Prophet Daniel and belongs to the Parish of Col.

References

External links

Sanabor at Geopedia

Populated places in the Municipality of Vipava